Freihalden station is a stop on the Augsburg-Ulm railroad line of Deutsche Bahn and is located in the municipality of Jettingen-Scheppach in the Freihalden district. The trains are operated by Deutsche Bahn Regio Bayern.

Services 
 the following services stop at Burgau (Schwab):

 : hourly service between Ulm Hauptbahnhof and München Hauptbahnhof.

References

External links 

 
 Freihalden station – Deutsche Bahn

Railway stations in Bavaria